Eupompha is a genus of blister beetles in the family Meloidae. There are about 14 described species in Eupompha.

Species
These 14 species belong to the genus Eupompha:

 Eupompha decolorata (Horn, 1894)
 Eupompha edmundsi Selander, 1953
 Eupompha elegans (LeConte, 1852)
 Eupompha fissiceps LeConte, 1858
 Eupompha fulleri Horn, 1878
 Eupompha histrionica Horn, 1891
 Eupompha imperialis Wellman, 1912
 Eupompha perpulchra Horn, 1870
 Eupompha schwarzi Wellman, 1909
 Eupompha sulcifrons Champion, 1892
 Eupompha terminalis Selander, 1957
 Eupompha viridis Horn, 1883
 Eupompha vizcaina Pinto, 1983
 Eupompha wenzeli Skinner, 1904

References

Further reading

 
 
 

Meloidae
Articles created by Qbugbot